Guichen Bay, (French: Baie de Guichen) is a bay located on the south-east coast of the Australian state of South Australia about  northwest of the regional city of Mount Gambier and about  south-southeast of the state capital of Adelaide.  It was named in 1802 by the Baudin expedition of 1800-03 after Luc Urbain de Bouëxic, comte de Guichen.  The town of Robe is located at the southern end of the bay.

Extent and description

Guichen Bay lies between Cape Thomas at its northern extremity and Cape Dombey at its southern extremity on the south-east coast of South Australia. The bay’s south shore consists of ‘rocky points and sandy bays’ with ‘drying rocks extend a short distance offshore’.

A number of navigation aids are located around Cape Dombey at the bay’s south end.  These consist of a lighthouse known as the Robe Lighthouse on Cape Dombey, a flashing light located near Commodore Point on the ocean coastline to the immediate south of Cape Dombey, and two lights within the bay - a light marking the end of the breakwater at the entrance of the Lake Butler marina in Robe and a flashing light near Robe Point.  Prior to the erection of the Robe Lighthouse in 1972, the sole navigational aid available for navigating in Robe was a Daymark in the form of an obelisk painted with red and white bands which is known as the Robe Obelisk.

History
The Bungandidj people were living in the Robe region prior to the arrival of Europeans.

The bay was first charted in 1802 by Baudin and Péron of the Baudin expedition. Baudin named the bay Ances des Albatross, but this was revised after his death, in Freycinet's publication, to Guichen Bay to honour French war hero Luc Urbain de Bouëxic, comte de Guichen.

In the 1830s, Bungandidj woman "Black Maggie" was the first indigenous inhabitant encountered by European men, probably whalers, sealers or sailors visiting the area several years before the South Australian province was proclaimed or settled by Europeans.

Ports and other settlements
Robe is the sole settlement and port in Guichen Bay.  Its infrastructure consists of a jetty and a marina complete with a protective breakwater.

Protected areas
The following protected areas respectively include and adjoin the bay’s extent: the Upper South East Marine Park and the Guichen Bay Conservation Park.

Citations and references

Citations

References

Bays of South Australia
Limestone Coast